The Magritte Award for Best Production Design (French: Magritte des meilleurs décors) is an award presented annually by the Académie André Delvaux. It is one of the Magritte Awards, which were established to recognize excellence in Belgian cinematic achievements.

The 1st Magritte Awards ceremony was held in 2011 with Eric Blesin and Marc Nis receiving the award for their work in A Town Called Panic. As of the 2022 ceremony, Lisa Etienne is the most recent winner in this category for her work in Madly in Life.

Winners and nominees 
In the list below, winners are listed first in the colored row, followed by the other nominees.

2010s

2020s

References

External links 
 Magritte Awards official website
 Magritte Award for Best Production Design at AlloCiné

2011 establishments in Belgium
Awards established in 2011
Awards for best art direction
Production Design